Sterling is a given name from the Old English , referring to the bird, starling; two variants of the name are Starling and Stirling.

Notable people with the name include:

 Sterling Archer, fictional character from Archer
 Sterling Foster Black (1924-1996), American lawyer
 Sterling K. Brown (born 1976), American actor
 W. Sterling Cary (1927–2021), American Christian minister
 Sterling Hayden (1916-1986), American actor and author
 Sterling Hitchcock (born 1971), American Major League Baseball pitcher
 Sterling Hofrichter (born 1996), American football player
 Sterling Holloway (1905-1992), American actor
 Sterling Hyltin (born 1985), American ballet dancer
 Sterling Jerins (born 2004), American actress
 Sterling Knight (born 1989), American actor
 Sterling Lord (1922-2022), American literary agent, editor, and author
 Sterling Marlin (born 1957), American retired NASCAR Driver and Daytona 500 champion
 Sterling Moore (born 1990), American football player
 Sterling Morrison (1942-1995), American guitar player with The Velvet Underground
 Sterling Sharpe (born 1965), American National Football League wide receiver
 Sterling Shepard (born 1993), American National Football League wide receiver
 Sterling Simms (born 1982), American singer on Def Jam
 Sterling Slaughter (born 1941), American Major League Baseball pitcher in 1964
 Sterling Tucker (1923–2019), American politician
 Sterling Van Wagenen (born 1947), American film producer and co-founder of the Sundance Film Festival
 Sterling Weatherford (born 1999), American football player

See also
 Stirling (given name)
 Starling (name)

References